The 1999 season was Santos Futebol Clube's eighty-seventh in existence and the club's forty consecutive season in the top flight of Brazilian football.

Source: Match reports in Competitive matches

Players

Squad

Source: Acervo Santista

Statistics

Appearances and goals

Source: Match reports in Competitive matches

Goalscorers

Source: Match reports in Competitive matches

Transfers

In

Out

Friendlies

Competitions

Overall summary

Campeonato Brasileiro

Results summary

First stage

Matches

Copa do Brasil

First round

Second round

Campeonato Paulista

Second stage

Group 4

Matches

Knockout stage

Semi-finals

Torneiro Rio-São Paulo

Group stage

Matches

Knockout stage

Semi-finals

Final

Qualification to Libertadores

First round

References

External links
1999 season at Acervo Santista 

1999
Santos F.C.